Appetizer for Destruction is an EP released by Canadian heavy metal band Brown Brigade in October 2006.

It was released before the release of their debut album, mainly to give fans a taste of the band's sound, while the band is working on their full-length album. The EP was sold exclusively at the band's live shows in October 2006, while supporting Pennywise and Circle Jerks on their Canadian tour.

The EP contains 3 songs that basically represent the blend of styles in the upcoming album and the band's musical style. While the EP is all consists of metal songs, each song is different: "E2DMFNF" is more of a rapcore/breakbeat song, "Blues Warrior" is a funk/reggae-influenced song, and finally "Last Writes" is a fast and edgy heavy metal song.

Originally, the EP was set to feature a demo song called "7x4" that was featured on the band's Myspace before. The song was later re-recorded for the debut album and renamed as "Blame the Wizards".

The title of the EP is a reference to the Guns N' Roses debut album Appetite for Destruction.

Track listing
 "E2DMFNF"
 "Blues Warrior"
 "Last Writes"

2006 EPs
Aquarius Records (Canada) EPs
Brown Brigade albums